Dewsville is an extinct town in Baker County, in the U.S. state of Georgia.

History
William W. Dews, an early postmaster, gave the community his last name.

See also
 Ghost town
Cheevertown, Georgia
Mimsville, Georgia

References

Geography of Baker County, Georgia
Ghost towns in Georgia (U.S. state)